Yazoo County High School (YCHS) is a public high school in unincorporated Yazoo County, Mississippi, near Yazoo City. It is a part of the Yazoo County School District.

It serves all areas of Yazoo County not in the city limits of Yazoo City. These areas include Benton, Bentonia, and Satartia.

See also
 Yazoo City High School

References

External links
 
 

Public high schools in Mississippi
Schools in Yazoo County, Mississippi